The 2018 Butler Bulldogs football team represented Butler University in the 2018 NCAA Division I FCS football season. They were led by 13th-year head coach Jeff Voris and played their home games at the Bud and Jackie Sellick Bowl. They were members of the Pioneer Football League. They finished the season 4–7, 2–6 in PFL play to finish in a three-way tie for seventh place.

Previous season
The Bulldogs finished the 2017 season 6–5, 4–4 in PFL play to finish in a tie for sixth place.

Preseason

Preseason All-PFL team
The PFL released their preseason all-PFL team on July 30, 2018, with the Bulldogs having four players selected.

Offense

Pace Temple – WR

Bobby Jensen – OL

Dakota Sneed – OL

Special teams

Drew Bevalhimer – K

Preseason coaches poll
The PFL released their preseason coaches poll on July 31, 2018, with the Bulldogs predicted to finish in a tie for fourth place.

Schedule

Source:

Game summaries

at Youngstown State

at Taylor

Princeton

Morehead State

at Drake

at Valparaiso

San Diego

Dayton

at Jacksonville

Stetson

at Davidson

References

Butler
Butler Bulldogs football seasons
Butler Bulldogs football